Got Something Good for You is an album by James Blood Ulmer and George Adams' band Phalanx which was recorded in 1985 and released on the German Moers Music label.

Track listing
All compositions by James Blood Ulmer except where noted
 "Upside Down" – 3:27
 "Funky Lover" – 6:51
 "Past Time" – 5:18
 "A Night Out" (George Adams) – 5:29
 "Rough Traders" (Adams, Ulmer) – 7:00
 "Love and Two Faces" – 6:12
 "House People" – 4:59

Personnel
James Blood Ulmer - guitar, vocals
George Adams - tenor saxophone, vocals
Amin Ali - electric bass
Calvin Weston - drums

References 

1986 albums
Phalanx (band) albums
Moers Music albums